An  or  is an edging strip of non-tatami-matted flooring in Japanese architecture, usually wood or bamboo. The  may run around the rooms, on the outside of the building, in which case they resemble a porch or sunroom.

An  allows the building to remain open in the rain or sun, without getting too wet or hot, and allows flexible ventilation and sightlines.

The area directly outside the paving is usually a collector drain that takes water still further away. The  is thus a way to bridge the obstacles good drainage puts between the indoors and the outdoors.

Structure
The  is supported on posts, identical to the other uprights of the house. The posts traditionally stand on half-buried stones, pounded into the earth with a specialized maul, and the wood posts shaped to fit the upper surface. More recent houses may use concrete footings.

The  floor may not be finished, or it may be polished or lacquered.

Terminology

 means an edge;  a side. Types of  include:

Positional terms
 , an inner , possibly enclosed
 , an  set one step below the floor (or ) inside it

If there are fewer than three , an  may be described by more than one of the positional terms.

Structural terms
 , a veranda with a slatted floor for better drainage
 , a bamboo

Relation to other house components
The  was often a ring of tatami-floored rooms, but could be an unmatted ; see also . In a large building, there could be further layers of tatami-floored rooms, courtyards, and further floorplan complications.

In Shoin-style buildings, the positioning of the  varied more, and the storm shutters slid rather than being hinged (usually horizontally).

The  is supported on posts, identical to the other uprights of the house. The posts stand on half-buried stones or concrete footings.

Cultural role
 are often proportioned so that one can sit on the edge and observe the garden. They provide a space for playing children and casual visitors.

An  is part of the house, and shoes are therefore not worn on it. Guests' shoes are lined up pointing outwards.

While  declined with the Westernization of Japanese architecture, they are making a comeback in modern architecture.

See also 

 Loggia
 Bay window
 Oriel window

References

Japanese architectural features
Flood control